Kenny Roby is a North Carolina-based singer-songwriter.  He's the former lead singer of 6 String Drag, which he formed with old friend bassist Rob Keller in the early 1990s and became one of the main bands of the era's so called Americana movement.   The band's style ranged from old style country with a hint of soul and gospel to rock.   While 6 String Drag broke up in the late 1990s, Roby continues to make records and play live shows with the Mercy Filter, which includes Scott McCall of $2 Pistols. In 2013 Roby released Memories & Birds which he described as "almost a concept album". In 2015, Roby reunited the original members of 6 String Drag and released Roots Rock 'N' Roll, of which Roby says "the songs kind of lent themselves to a 50’s and 60’s style."  Roby's latest album is 2020's The Reservoir.  AmericanaUK called the album, "A sparse, personal narrative built on pain, loss, and the hardships of life."

Discography

With 6 String Drag
6 String Drag (1996)
High Hat (1997)
The JAG Sessions - Rare & Unreleased 1996-1998 (2014)
Roots Rock 'N' Roll (2015)
Top of the World (2018)

Solo
Mercury's Blues (1999)
Black River Sides (with Neal Casal, 1999)
Rather Not Know (2002)
The Mercy Filter (2006)
Memories & Birds (2013)
The Reservoir (2020)

References

External links
Official website 

Living people
American alternative country singers
American male singer-songwriters
American country singer-songwriters
Singer-songwriters from North Carolina
Country musicians from North Carolina
Year of birth missing (living people)